Sammy Watkins may refer to:

 Sammy Watkins (born 1993), American football player
 Sammy Watkins (musician), American musician